L&B or L and B may refer to:

L&B Spumoni Gardens, pizzeria and restaurant in New York City 
Lynton and Barnstaple Railway, a railway in England 
Lambert & Butler, a cigarette brand